This is a list of national days of mourning between 2000 and 2019. It does not include annual remembrance events.

2000–2004

2005–2009

2010–2014

2015–2019

See also 
 National day of mourning
 European Day of Mourning, a similar concept at the EU level

Notes

References 

Death customs
Mourning (2000-2019)
Lists of disasters
national days of mourning